William B. Hanna School was a historic school building located in the Carroll Park neighborhood of Philadelphia, Pennsylvania. It was designed by Henry deCoursey Richards and built in 1908–1909. It was a three-story, reinforced concrete, brick faced building in the Late Gothic Revival-style. It featured a central Gothic arched entry with grotesques, limestone trim, and a cornice with terra cotta trim. The school name was changed to Guion Bluford Elementary School in recognition of astronaut Guion Bluford, who attended Hanna School. The older portion of the school was demolished in 2010 and a replacement attached to its 1974 addition.

It was added to the National Register of Historic Places in 1986.

References

School buildings on the National Register of Historic Places in Philadelphia
Gothic Revival architecture in Pennsylvania
School buildings completed in 1909
School District of Philadelphia
West Philadelphia
1909 establishments in Pennsylvania